NGC 6027b is an interacting lenticular galaxy that is part of Seyfert's Sextet, a compact group of galaxies currently in the process of colliding and merging, which is located in the constellation Serpens.

See also 

 NGC 6027
 NGC 6027a
 NGC 6027c
 NGC 6027d
 NGC 6027e
 Seyfert's Sextet

References

External links 
 HubbleSite NewsCenter: Pictures and description

Serpens (constellation)
Lenticular galaxies
6027b
56584
10116 NED03